The Iori is a river in the South Caucasus that originates in the Greater Caucasus Mountains in eastern Georgia and continues into Azerbaijan, where it is also known as Gabirry (Qabirry) and flows into the Mingachevir reservoir, which is drained by the river Kura. It starts in the mountains northeast of Tianeti, flows through that town, swings east and flows through the lowlands parallel to and between the Alazani (north) and the Kura (south). 

In Antiquity, the river was known as the Cambyses river. This ancient name of the river was also lent to the ancient region of Cambysene.

References 

   

Rivers of Georgia (country)
Rivers of Azerbaijan
International rivers of Europe
International rivers of Asia
Azerbaijan–Georgia (country) border
Border rivers